is a monthly Japanese yaoi manga magazine published by Libre. The magazine was originally launched by Biblos under the publisher Hekitensha in March 1993 until Biblos' bankruptcy in 2006.

Publications

In addition to Magazine Be × Boy, several ongoing and defunct spin-off magazines have been published under the Be × Boy brand.

Serializations

Be × Boy

Current
 Don't Be Cruel (2006–present)
 His Favorite (2008–present)
 Dakaichi (2013–present)
 Gender-Swap at the Delinquent Academy (2014–present)
 Caste Heaven (2014–2021)

Former

Kizuna: Bonds of Love (1992–2008)
Fake (1994–2000)
Love Mode (1995–2003)
Truly Kindly (1997)
Ichigenme... The First Class is Civil Law (1998–2002)
Until the Full Moon (1998)
Menkui! (2000–2003)
Our Kingdom (2000–2007)
...But, I'm Your Teacher (2001)
Close the Last Door (2001–2004)
Yellow (2001–2004)
Wild Rock (2002)
Black Knight (2003–2005)
Bond(z) (2003)
Cut (2003)
Golden Cain (2003)
Love Pistols (2003–2006)
Awkward Silence (2004–2016)
Gakuen Heaven (2004)
Kurashina Sensei's Passion (2004–2006)
Man's Best Friend (2004–2007)
Selfish Love (2004)
Shinobu Kokoro: Hidden Heart (2004)
Clan of the Nakagamis (2005)
The Sky Over My Spectacles (2005)
A Strange and Mystifying Story (2005–2012)
Loving Gaze (2006)
Necratoholic (2006)
Alcohol, Shirt and Kiss (2007)
Cause of My Teacher (2007)
Hey, Sensei? (2007)
You Make My Head Spin! (2007)
 Kichiku Megane (2007-2012)
 Repeat After Me? (2008-2009)
 Prince of Recipe (2012-2013)
 The Night Beyond the Tricornered Window (2013-2020)

Be × Boy Gold

Current
Finder (2002–present)

Former
Level C (1993–1996)
Embracing Love (1999–2009)
Lovers in the Night (1999)
Gerard & Jacques (2000–2001)
Hybrid Child (2003–2005)
Play Boy Blues (2003–2008)
Hero Heel (2005–2007) 
Love Control (2006–2007)
The Devil's Secret (2007)

References

External links
 

Monthly manga magazines published in Japan
Magazines established in 1993
Yaoi manga magazines